Eldorado Peak is a  peak, and is the 25th highest peak in Washington. It is located in North Cascades National Park at the head of Marble Creek and just west of the Inspiration Glacier. Other glaciers in the immediate vicinity include Eldorado Glacier and McAllister Glacier; thus Eldorado is flanked by the largest continuous non-volcanic ice sheet in the lower 48 states.

Climbing 
Eldorado appears quite different depending on the side one is viewing. On the west side the peak is a steep face made of vertical slabs and small gullies.  From the east side the mountain is a small rocky outcropping surrounded by ice. The south face is a triangular face flanked by long ridgelines.  The most popular and easiest climbing route is from the south and east, via the Inspiration Glacier and a moderately steep snow ridge.  Eldorado is a popular climbing destination due to easy access, being one of the 100 highest peaks in Washington, and superb mountain views.  Most climbers will take two days to complete the trip, though the climb can be completed in one long day.

Routes 

West Arete rock route up the west face  Grade IV
East ridge Glacier travel to steep snow ascent 
Northeast ridge ice and snow ascent Class AI2
Northwest Ice Corridor ice and rock class M3 to M4

Geology
Eldorado is very simple geologically when compared to other mountains in the Cascades, with only one major rock type, Cretaceous orthogneiss, more specifically biotite granodiorite. Only the lowest flanks are made of different rock types, mostly heterogeneous metamorphic rock.  There are only two normal faults: one on the east flank, the other on the west flank.

Climate

Eldorado Peak is located in the marine west coast climate zone of western North America. Most weather fronts originate in the Pacific Ocean, and travel northeast toward the Cascade Mountains. As fronts approach the North Cascades, they are forced upward by the peaks of the Cascade Range (Orographic lift), causing them to drop their moisture in the form of rain or snowfall onto the Cascades. As a result, the west side of the North Cascades experiences high precipitation, especially during the winter months in the form of snowfall. Due to its temperate climate and proximity to the Pacific Ocean, areas west of the Cascade Crest very rarely experience temperatures below  or above . During winter months, weather is usually cloudy, but, due to high pressure systems over the Pacific Ocean that intensify during summer months, there is often little or no cloud cover during the summer. Because of maritime influence, snow tends to be wet and heavy, resulting in high avalanche danger.

See also
 List of mountains of the United States

References

External links

 
 

Mountains of Washington (state)
North Cascades of Washington (state)
Mountains of Skagit County, Washington
North Cascades National Park